The following is a timeline of the presidency of Bill Clinton, from January 1, 1997, to December 31, 1997.

January 
 January 4 – President Clinton stated he was preparing to approach his second term with a continued effort toward preparing individuals for the 21st century. During his radio address, he reported a 50% increase in child support collections over the last four years.
 January 6 – President Clinton gave a speech at the Ecumenical Prayer Breakfast in the State Dining Room of the White House.
 January 9 – In a joint session of the United States Congress, the results for the electoral college were counted. In his role as President of the Senate, Vice President Al Gore read the results and declared President Clinton as the winner of the 1996 presidential election.
 January 20 – Second inauguration of Bill Clinton.
 January 21 – President Clinton gave a speech at a Democratic National Committee at Washington Hilton Hotel during the afternoon.  President Clinton submitted a message to Congress on the continuation of Middle East terrorism. 
 January 22 – President Clinton had a short exchange with reporters over the explosion on 16th Street on the South Lawn and delivered an address at Stanley Field Middle School in Northbrook, Illinois during the morning.

February 
February 4 – President Clinton delivered his annual State of the Union Address before a joint session of Congress.

March 
 March 3 – President Clinton submitted a message to Congress transferring the Second Supplementary Canada-United States Social Security Agreement. President Clinton held his sixth meeting with President of the Palestinian National Authority Yasser Arafat in the Oval Office in the morning. President Clinton attended the East Room ceremony announcing the Coalition for America's Children Public Service Announcement during the afternoon.
 March 4 – President Clinton announced the prohibition on human beings cloning being funded by the federal government during a morning appearance in the Oval Office. President Clinton proceeded to answer questions from reporters.
 March 10 – President Clinton and President of Egypt Hosni Mubarak held a joint news conference in the East Room during the afternoon. President Clinton stated the decision of Senator Wendell Ford not to seek reelection to the Senate.
 March 11 – President Clinton delivered an address at the National Press Club during the morning.

April 
 April 10 – Radio and Television Correspondents' Association Dinner
 April 26 – White House Correspondents' Dinner

May

June

July 
July 1 – President Clinton announced the Electronic Commerce Initiative in the East Room during the afternoon. In his remarks, President Clinton stated the intention of his administration to implement the initiative by the first day of the year 2000. President Clinton issued a memorandum on electric commerce to the leadership of executive departments and agencies.  President Clinton signed a proclamation implementing the Information Technology Agreement. He released a statement the same day stating that the agreement "will cut to zero tariffs on a vast array of computers, semiconductors, and telecommunications technology by the year 2000." President Clinton released a message online regarding the report A Framework for Global Electronic Commerce, released earlier in the day.

August

September 
 September 27 – A recording of President Clinton discussing the continued refusal by the Senate to confirm his judicial nominees and calls for the upper chamber's cessation of this practice so "the unbroken legacy of our strong, independent judiciary can continue for generations to come" was broadcast on the radio.
 September 27 – President Clinton attended the Hot Springs High School Ultimate Class Reunion on the front steps of Hot Springs High School in Hot Springs, Arkansas.
 September 27 – President Clinton attended a reception for the Arkansas State Democratic Party on Ray Winder Baseball Field in Little Rock, Arkansas.
 September 27 – President Clinton attended a candlelight vigil for the Little Rock Nine on the lawn of the Administration Building at Philander Smith College.
 September 29 – President Clinton presented the National Arts and Humanities Medals in the Rose Garden. 
 September 29 – President Clinton stated the observance of National Arts and Humanities Month. 
 September 29 – President Clinton delivered remarks on the Income and Poverty Report and answered questions from reporters on campaign finance reform and welfare reform in the Briefing Room. 
 September 29 – President Clinton attended the National Arts and Humanities Medals Dinner on the State Floor of the White House. 
 September 30 – President Clinton delivered remarks in which he charged members of Congress with trying to undermine the administration's commitment to education reform and stated his intent to "veto any legislation that damages our commitment to public education and high national standards" on the South Lawn. President Clinton then answered questions from reporters on the Internal Revenue Service. 
 September 30 – President Clinton attended a President's Advisory Board meeting on Race in the East Room at the Mayflower Hotel.
 September 30 – President Clinton attended the retirement ceremony for General John M. Shalikashvili at Fort Myer in Arlington, Virginia.
 September 30 – President Clinton stated the death of Roy Lichtenstein and the latter's contributions to the alteration of art.
 September 30 – President Clinton stated the final report of the Commission on Immigration Reform, saying it "further contributes to our country's understanding of the role of immigration in the United States."
 September 30 – President Clinton stated the observance of Rosh Hashanah.
 September 30 – President Clinton signed the Military Construction Appropriations Act, 1998 into law, saying the legislation "provides funding for military construction and family housing programs of the Department of Defense" and "funds the vast majority of my request for military construction projects, the military family housing program, other quality-of-life projects for our military personnel and their families, and the base closure and realignment program."
 September 30 – In a statement, President Clinton stated House Joint Resolution 94 "provides 1998 appropriations for continuing projects and activities of the Federal Government through October 23, 1997, except those funded by the Military Construction Appropriations Act, 1998, which I signed into law earlier today."
 September 30 – President Clinton issued a message to Congress on the continued national emergency in Iran.

October 
 October 1 – President Clinton addressed television weather broadcasters on his desire for Americans to accept the majority scientific opinion and for the United States to commit "to go to Kyoto with binding targets" in the East Room.
 October 1 – In a statement, President Clinton stated his satisfaction with the Senate Finance Committee reporting out legislation renewing the partnership between the President and the Congress in reaching trade agreements and calls for continued breaking down of "unfair foreign trade barriers to our goods and services."
 October 2 – President Clinton announced he would be "directing the Secretary of Health and Human Services and the Secretary of Agriculture to work together in close cooperation with the agricultural community to develop the first-ever specific safety standards for the growing, processing, shipping, and selling of fruits and vegetables" and answered questions from reporters on the Line Item Veto, the 2000 Decennial Census, food safety, and campaign financing during the 1996 elections in the Rose Garden.
 October 2 – President Clinton issued a memorandum to the Secretary of Health and Human Services and Secretary of Agriculture requesting the duo direct focus "on the safety of fruits and vegetables".."
 October 3 – In a statement, President Clinton noted the announcement by the Labor Department and called for continued efforts to ensure Americans benefit from the economy and application of the three-part economic strategy.
 October 3 – In a statement, President Clinton noted the release of the final crime statistics for 1996 by the Federal Bureau of Investigation and called the results "good news for all Americans," citing the continued drop in crime and benefits for law-abiding citizens.
 October 4 – In a live morning Oval Office address, President Clinton delivered remarks on the importance of the American family and the benefits given to parents as a result of the family leave law, as well as the bipartisan support for parents taking accountability for their children.
 October 4 – A recording of President Clinton endorsing the campaign finance reform bill of Senators John McCain and Russ Feingold by saying it would "curb the power of special interests and increase the confidence of the American people in our campaign finance system" was broadcast.
 October 4 – President Clinton attended a dinner for Democratic gubernatorial candidate Don Beyer in Chesapeake Hall of the National Airport Hilton Hotel in Arlington, Virginia.
 October 6 – President Clinton delivered the opening remarks at the White House Conference on Climate Change in Gaston Hall at Georgetown University.
 October 6 – During the White House Conference on Climate Change, President Clinton delivered remarks on previous congressional actions toward the environment and a green line not within reach unless preceded by "a global agreement that involves both the developing and the developed countries."
 October 6 – President Clinton delivered remarks on his signing of the Line Item Vetoes of the Military Construction Appropriations Act, 1998, six days prior and answered questions from reporters on videotapes of White House coffees, the Stand-Clark-Squillacote espionage case, and the assassination attempt of Khaled Meshal in the Oval Office.
 October 6 – President Clinton canceled "the dollar amounts of discretionary budget authority, as specified in the attached reports" in a message to Congress.
 October 18 – President Clinton delivered remarks on the international response to the challenge of climate change at Nahuel Huapi National Park in San Carlos de Bariloche, Argentina.
 October 20 – A recording of President Clinton discussing a report by the Education Department confirming students "who challenge themselves with rigorous math and science courses in high school are much more likely to go on to college" was broadcast on the radio.
 October 21 – President Clinton delivered remarks on America Reads Initiative and education within the United States in the East Room.
 October 21 – President Clinton delivered remarks to the Congressional Caucus for Women's Issues in the Mellon Auditorium at the Department of Commerce.
 October 21 – President Clinton attended a dinner for the Democratic Senatorial Campaign Committee in the Ballroom at the Hyatt Regency Hotel.
 October 22 – President Clinton addressed the National Geographic Society in the Gilbert Grosvenor Auditorium.
 October 23 – President Clinton attended a White House Conference on Child Care in the East Room session.
 October 23 – In a statement, President Clinton lamented the death of Ann Devroy and notes her accomplishments as a White House correspondent.
 October 23 – President Clinton signed House Joint Resolution 97 into law. President Clinton said the resolution provides "1998 appropriations for continuing projects and activities of the Federal Government through November 7, 1997, except those funded by the five bills that I have already signed into law."
 October 24 – President Clinton delivered remarks to the National Board for Professional Teaching Standards Honoring Board-Certified Master Teachers in a pavilion on the South Lawn.
 October 24 – President Clinton delivered remarks to the Asia Society and the United States-China Education Foundation Board in the auditorium at the Voice of America.
 October 25 – A recording of President Clinton announcing "new FDA regulations that will ensure medical facilities, health providers, and detection equipment are all held to the highest possible standards so that every woman gets the quality care she needs when she needs it most" was broadcast on the radio.
 October 25 – President Clinton delivered remarks to the National Italian-American Foundation in the International Ballroom at the Washington Hilton Hotel.
 October 27 – President Clinton delivered remarks to the 1997 NCAA Men's and Women's Basketball Champions in the East Room.
 October 27 – President Clinton delivered remarks to the Democratic Leadership Council in the Regency Ballroom at the Omni Shoreham Hotel.
 October 27 – President Clinton signed the Departments of Veterans Affairs and Ho, Housing and Urban Development, and Independent Agencies Appropriations Act, 1998. President Clinton said the legislation "will fund vital environmental, veterans, housing, community development, space, and science programs" and provide "funding for the Departments of Veterans Affairs and Housing and Urban Development, the Environmental Protection Agency, the National Aeronautics and Space Administration, the National Science Foundation, and several other agencies."
 October 27 – President Clinton signed the Department of Transportation and Related Agencies Appropriations Act, 1998 into law. President Clinton said the legislation "provides funds to improve safety on our highways, airways, and waterways" in addition to permitting "the highest level of Federal infrastructure investment in history--investment to improve our Nation's highways, transit systems, Amtrak, and airports and, as a result, improve personal mobility and make America a better global competitor."
 October 27 – President and First Lady Clinton attended a birthday party for the First Lady in Gar Hall at the Chicago Cultural Center in Chicago, Illinois.
 October 28 – President Clinton delivered remarks in the auditorium of Oscar Mayer Elementary School in Chicago.
 October 28 – President Clinton issued a memorandum to the Secretary of Education on the subject of low-performing public schools and the success of the strategy the administration has imposed toward the education system.
 October 28 – In a statement, President Clinton lamented the death of Walter H. Capps and notes his characteristics such as his devotion to his community.
 October 29 – In a message to Congress, President Clinton transmitted a "report on the Nation's achievements in aeronautics and space during fiscal year (FY) 1996, as required under section 206 of the National Aeronautics and Space Act of 1958, as amended (42 U.S.C. 2476)."
 October 29 – President Clinton attended the welcoming ceremony for President of the People's Republic of China Jiang Zemin on the South Lawn.
 October 29 – President Clinton began a news conference with remarks on his interactions with Chinese President Jiang and answered questions from reporters on Jiang's visit, Tiananmen Square, Taiwan, human rights, nuclear cooperation between China and the United States, American troops in Asia, China, Russia, and the United States, relations between China and the United States, and Tibet in Room 450 of the Old Executive Office Building.
 October 29 – The United States and China issued a joint statement on the "in-depth and productive exchange of views on the international situation, U.S.-China relations and the important opportunities and challenges facing the two countries" held between President Clinton and President Jiang.
 October 29 – In a statement, President Clinton lamented the death of American Federation of Government Employees National President John N. Sturdivant and his role in the American trade union movement.
 October 29 – President Clinton attended a state dinner honoring Chinese President Jiang in the East Room.
 October 30 – President Clinton unveiled the STARBRIGHT World On-Line Computer Network during remarks at the Children's Hospital National Medical Center.
 October 30 – President Clinton signed H.J. Res. 75 into law, conferring "Bob Hope the status of honorary veteran of the U.S. Armed Forces and extends to him the gratitude of the American people for his lifetime of accomplishments and service on behalf of our men and women in uniform."
 October 30 – In a statement, President Clinton expressed his satisfaction with the Senate scheduling a vote on campaign finance reform. He stated that it will "pave the way for the first up-or-down vote ever on the McCain-Feingold bill."
 October 30 – In a statement, President Clinton applauded House Speaker Gingrich for scheduling "a vote in the House of Representatives for next Friday, November 7, on the renewal of traditional trade negotiating authority."
 October 30 – In a message to Congress, President Clinton transmitted "the text of a proposed Agreement for Cooperation Between the Government of the United States of America and the Government of the Federative Republic of Brazil Concerning Peaceful Uses of Nuclear Energy".
 October 31 – President Clinton delivered remarks in the warehouse of the Tropical Shipping Company endorsing members of Congress granting him the authority to enter agreements and urging their constituents to contact them in regards to the matter.
 October 31 – President Clinton delivered remarks on the athletic field of Lighthouse Elementary School in Jupiter, Florida.
 October 31 – President Clinton delivered remarks on the economic policy of the administration and moves toward preparing the United States for the 21st Century before he answered questions on education, Iran, child care, and brain development at a private residence.
 October 31 - President Clinton attended a dinner for the Democratic Congressional Campaign Committee at a private residence in Boca Raton, Florida.

November 
 November 21 – President Clinton signed the Food and Drug Administration Modernization Act of 1997 and the Food and Drug Administration Modernization Act of 1997 into law.
 November 21 – President Clinton received the Man of Peace Award in the East Room at the White House during the afternoon. President Clinton issued a statement favoring the Korean Peninsula Peace Process.
 November 22 – President Clinton delivered a speech at a private residence dinner for Patty Murray and a reception for Murray at the Pavilion at the Seattle Center during the evening.
 November 23 – President Clinton issued statements on the effectiveness of his administration's crime policy  and the death of Jorge Mas Canosa.
 November 24 – President Clinton spoke to reporters at the Waterfront Centre Hotel on foreign policy during the afternoon.
 November 25 – President Clinton delivered an address to the United States Consulate Staff at the Shaughnessy Golf Course during the afternoon.
 November 26 – President Clinton signed the Departments of Commerce, Justice, State, the Judiciary, and Related Agencies Appropriations Act, 1998, and the Foreign Operations, Export Financing, and Related Programs Appropriations Act, 1998 into law. President Clinton attended the Thanksgiving Turkey Presentation Ceremony in the Rose Garden of the White House during the afternoon.
 November 29 – A recording of President Clinton speaking on Thanksgiving, American families, and legislation was broadcast on the radio.

December 
 December 1 – President Clinton spoke on the budget for the following year as well as the International Agreement on Greenhouse Gas Emissions in the Cabinet Room during the morning. President Clinton delivered an address at a Democratic National Committee Dinner at the Renaissance Mayflower Hotel during the evening. President Clinton issued a memorandum directing HIV prevention in federal programs within the following 90 days.
 December 2 – President Clinton announced the appointment of Togo D. West, Jr. as Acting United States Secretary of Veterans Affairs in the Roosevelt Room of the White House during the morning and signed the Amtrak Reform and Accountability Act of 1997, representing "the first Amtrak reauthorization since 1992 and the most comprehensive restructuring of Amtrak since the early 1980s."
 December 3 – President Clinton delivered an address on race at E.J. Thomas Performing Arts Hall at the University of Akron and participated in a discussion during the afternoon. President Clinton delivered a speech at a reception for the Democratic Party in Chicago, Illinois during the evening.
 December 4 – President Clinton lighted the National Christmas Tree on the Ellipse during the evening.
 December 5 – President Clinton spoke with reporters on his administration's foreign policy in the Oval Office during the morning. President Clinton announced the appointments to the National Bipartisan Commission on the Future of Medicare amid a press conference on the South Lawn in the afternoon.
 December 6 – President Clinton spoke on school violence and announced a directing of an initiative "to produce for the first time an annual report card on school violence" during his radio address.
 December 7 – President Clinton delivered an address at the Metropolitan Baptist Church during the morning and gave a speech at the reception for the Kennedy Center Honors during the afternoon.
 December 9 – President Clinton issued statements on the death of Jeanette E. Rockefeller and the fortieth anniversary of the Justice Civil Rights Division Department. President Clinton delivered an address commemorating the fiftieth anniversary of the Universal Declaration of Human Rights in the Jewish Heritage Museum during the evening.
 December 10 – President Clinton delivered an address at the Madison Square Boys and Girls Club in New York City during the morning. President Clinton gave a speech at a Democratic Congressional Campaign Committee Dinner in the Empire Room at the Waldorf Astoria and a Democratic National Committee Hispanic Dinner in the Rainbow Room during the evening.
 December 11 – President Clinton delivered an address on the sea at the U.S. Coast Guard Station in Miami, Florida , during the morning.
 December 12 – President Clinton issued a statement on that day's International Financial Services Agreement.
 December 13 – President Clinton spoke on Medicare reform and his dedication to seeing it through during a radio address from the Oval Office. President Clinton delivers an address at the Arkansas Democratic National Committee Dinner during the evening.
 December 14 – President Clinton delivered an address on Christmas at the National Building Museum during the afternoon.
 December 15 – President Clinton and Prime Minister of Ireland Bertie Ahern held a joint news conference in the Northwest Portfolio at the White House during the morning. President Clinton announces the appointment of Bill Lann Lee as Acting Assistant Attorney General for Civil Rights in the Oval Office at the White House during the afternoon.
 December 19 – President Clinton delivered an address at the Malcolm Baldrige National Quality Awards at the Sheraton Washington Hotel in the morning. President Clinton participated in a Race Initiative Outreach Meeting in the Oval Office of the White House during the afternoon. 
 December 20 – President Clinton spoke on the efforts by the government to assist children with evading drug usage during his radio address in a recording made the previous day and aired during the morning.
 December 23 – President Clinton stated the trial of the Oklahoma City bombing, saying in part, "the successful prosecution of Timothy McVeigh and Terry Nichols should offer a measure of comfort that all Americans stand with the families of Oklahoma City."
 December 27 – President Clinton announced, announced on January 1, that Medicare beneficiaries would be eligible for more cancer screenings.  
 December 28 – Senior Advisor to President Rahm Emanuel said President Clinton's 1998 budget would not propose any major tax cut, but that he would be open to receiving a tax cut from Congress so long as it would not violate a spending agreement designed for a balancing of the budget by 2002.
 December 29 – President Clinton issued statements on the Health Care Task Force and a condemnation of the vandalizing of the Islamic Star.

References

External links 
 Miller Center Clinton Presidential Timeline

See also 

 Timeline of the Bill Clinton presidency, for an index of the Clinton presidency timeline articles

Presidency of Bill Clinton
1997